Colonel Leroy Victor Grosshuesch (May 6, 1920 – May 7, 2015) was a United States Air Force officer who served in World War II and the Vietnam War, achieving Flying ace status in the Pacific Theater with eight kills.

Early life
He was born on 6 May 1920 in Menno, South Dakota. He graduated from Yankton High School and attended the University of Maryland.

Military career
He enlisted in the United States Army in January 1942 and was assigned to the Quartermaster Corps. In October 1942 he became an aviation cadet. He qualified as a pilot at Selma Army Airfield and was commissioned as a Second Lieutenant in the United States Army Air Forces on 28 July 1943. He was assigned to the 439th Fight Squadron at Dale Mabry Field converting to fly the P-47 Thunderbolt.

In November 1943 he was assigned to the 39th Fighter Squadron in New Guinea. On 21 November 1944 he achieved his first kill, shooting down a Mitsubishi Ki-46 over Negros Island. On 30 January 1945 he shot down two biplane trainers west of Taicha Airfield, Formosa. On 10 February he shot down a further two biplane trainers and another Ki-46 over Formosa. On 25 February he shot down another Ki-46 west of Formosa.

By late July 1945 the 39th Fighter Squadron had converted to flying the P-51 Mustang and the squadron was operating from Yontan Airfield on Okinawa. Multiple sources state that on 30 July Grosshuesch was credited with single-handedly sinking an Imperial Japanese Navy (IJN) Destroyer off Goto Retto island. However the official joint U.S. Army/Navy records of IJN ship losses state that the only IJN ships sunk on 30 July were the Escort ship Okinawa sunk by Navy carrier aircraft near Maizuru and the Destroyer Hatsushimo sunk by USAAF aircraft, near Miyazu.

On 12 August he made his eighth and final kill shooting down a Nakajima Ki-84.
Grosshuesch was one of 25 pilots interviewed for the Fifth Air Force military monograph Fighter Combat Tactics in the Southwest Pacific Area, which was prepared to assist newer pilots arriving in the Pacific Theater.

After serving occupation duty in Japan he returned to the U.S. in August 1946 and was assigned to the 61st Fighter Squadron at Selfridge Field. In April 1947 he transferred to the 335th Fighter Squadron at Andrews Field and converted to the P-80 Shooting Star.

From April 1949 to April 1951 he was assigned to the USAF Group, American Mission for Aid to Turkey, in Ankara.

In July 1954 he was given command of the 452nd Fighter-Day Squadron at Foster Air Force Base flying F-86 Sabres. In June 1955 he was appointed commander of the 36th Fighter-Bomber Squadron at Itazuke Air Base, flying F-86F Sabres and then F-100 Super Sabres.

He graduated from Air Command and Staff College in August 1959 and then from Air War College in 1964.

In July 1964 he was assigned to South Vietnam where served as commander of the Special Air Operations Group.

From August 1965 to July 1968 he served at Headquarters, Pacific Air Forces at Hickam Air Force Base, Hawaii as Deputy Director, Operations Plans. In July 1970 he returned to Hickam as Director, Operations Plans.

He retired from the Air Force in May 1973.

Later life
He worked for the Weyerhaeuser in Honolulu, Hawaii until retiring in July 1992. He and his wife lived in Kailua, Hawaii until his death in 2015.

Decorations
His decorations included the Silver Star, Legion of Merit and Distinguished Flying Cross (2)

References

1920 births
United States Army Air Forces pilots of World War II
United States Air Force personnel of the Vietnam War
American World War II flying aces
American Vietnam War pilots
2015 deaths
American expatriates in Japan
Recipients of the Silver Star
Recipients of the Distinguished Flying Cross (United States)
Recipients of the Legion of Merit
Recipients of the Air Medal
Military personnel from South Dakota
Aviators from South Dakota
People from Hutchinson County, South Dakota